Debevoise & Plimpton LLP (often shortened to Debevoise) is an international law firm headquartered in New York City. Founded in 1931 by Harvard Law School alumnus Eli Whitney Debevoise and Oxford-trained William Stevenson, the firm was originally named “Debevoise, Plimpton & McLean”.  Debevoise specializes in private equity, M&A, insurance and financial services transactions, private funds, complex litigation, investigations, and international arbitration. In 2021, the firm assisted the Democratic Party in the second impeachment trial of Donald Trump. Debevoise consistently ranks among the most profitable law firms in the world on a per partner basis.

Overview 
Debevoise & Plimpton currently employs approximately 769 lawyers in nine offices throughout the world.  The firm divides its practices into three major areas: Corporate, Litigation, and Tax.  In recent years, the firm's practice has taken on an increasingly international component.

Debevoise & Plimpton has offices across three continents, and locations include New York City, Washington D.C., London, Paris, Frankfurt, Moscow, Hong Kong, and Shanghai. In 2016, Debevoise opened a new office in Tokyo. On June 1, 2020, Debevoise & Plimpton announced the opening of an office in Luxembourg.

Debevoise is the only law firm in the world to have both a former US and UK Attorney-General simultaneously as partners (Michael Mukasey in the U.S. and Lord Goldsmith KC in the U.K.).

Reputation and rankings 
Debevoise & Plimpton is consistently among the most profitable large law firms in the world on a per-partner and per-lawyer basis according to American Lawyer magazine's annual AmLaw 100 Survey. Debevoise was placed overall No. 1 in The American Lawyer's "10-Year A-List," a ranking of the law firms who have earned the highest cumulative score on the A-List since its inception in 2003. The annual A-List ranks firms according to their performance in four categories: revenue per lawyer, pro bono service, associate satisfaction, and diversity.

Milestones

 1931:  Debevoise and Stevenson from Davis Polk & Wardwell form partnership
 1933:  Francis T. P. Plimpton joins to form Debevoise, Stevenson & Plimpton
 1936:  Robert G. Page joins to form Debevoise, Stevenson, Plimpton & Page
 1943:  Firm merges with Hatch, McLean, Root & Hinch
 1947:  Firm renames as Debevoise, Plimpton & McLean
 1949:  Firm loses Hiss Case
 1981:  Firm renames as Debevoise & Plimpton for 50th anniversary
 2017: Former Chair of the United States Securities and Exchange Commission and United States Attorney for the Southern District of New York Mary Jo White rejoins the firm's New York office as a partner and senior chair

Assistance to Guantanamo prisoners

Attorneys from Debevoise & Plimpton worked on behalf of prisoners held in extrajudicial detention in the United States Guantanamo Bay detention camps, in Cuba.  Jeff Lang, of Debevoise & Plimpton, was one of the first Guantanamo Bay attorneys to file an appeal in the Federal appeal court in Washington DC of prisoners' Combatant Status Review Tribunal proceedings. The Detainee Treatment Act of 2005 included provision for prisoners to challenge whether the Tribunals' decisions complied with the Tribunal's mandate.  Charles "Cully" Stimson, then Deputy Assistant Secretary of Defense for Detainee Affairs, stirred controversy when he went on record criticizing the patriotism of law firms that allowed employees to assist Guantanamo prisoners: "corporate CEOs seeing this should ask firms to choose between lucrative retainers and representing terrorists." Stimson's views were widely criticized. The Pentagon disavowed them, and Stimson resigned shortly thereafter.

2010s
Take-Two Interactive Software, in defense of lawsuit filed by actress Lindsay Lohan, which claimed that Take-Two subsidiary Rockstar Games was in breach of her image rights, as basing its Grand Theft Auto V "Lacey Jonas" character on Lohan without her consent, citing similarities. The case was dismissed on September 1, 2016, then dismissed on Appeal, on March 29, 2018.

Notable attorneys and alumni
Louis Begley
Terrence Berg, Federal District Court Judge, Eastern District of Michigan
Anita Bernstein, law professor
Allison Christians
Andrew Ceresney, former head of enforcement at U.S. Securities and Exchange Commission
Neil Eggleston, former White House Counsel
Peter Goldsmith, Baron Goldsmith, former Attorney General for England and Wales and Northern Ireland, and current head of European litigation practice at Debevoise & Plimpton.
John Gleeson, former judge
Tali Farhadian, former federal prosecutor and candidate for New York County District Attorney
Harold H. Healy Jr.
Michael E. Horowitz, Inspector General for the United States Department of Justice 
Ethan Leib, law professor
Edward Cochrane McLean
Barry Mills, former president of Bowdoin College
Michael Mukasey, former Attorney General of the United States
Jed S. Rakoff, judge
Stanley Rogers Resor
Lorna G. Schofield, judge
Joan Wexler (born 1946), Dean and President of Brooklyn Law School
Gregory Howard Woods, judge
Édouard Philippe, Prime Minister of France from May 2017 to July 2020.
Mary Jo White

See also

White-shoe firms
List of largest law firms by profits per partner
Francis T. P. Plimpton

References

Further reading

External links
Official Firm Website
Debevoise & Plimpton Marks 75th Anniversary

 
Law firms established in 1931
Law firms based in New York City
Foreign law firms with offices in Hong Kong